LaRita A. "Rita" Aragon (born December 3, 1947) is a retired United States Air National Guard two-star general who most recently served as the 4th Oklahoma Secretary of Veterans Affairs. Her final active military post was as the Air National Guard assistant to the Air Force Deputy Chief of Staff Manpower and Personnel. She retired in 2006.

Aragon is the first woman to hold the position of VA Secretary. As secretary, Aragon serves as Governor Mary Fallin's chief advisor on matters related to the policies and operations of the Oklahoma Department of Veterans Affairs.

Military career
Rita Aragon earned her Bachelor of Science in education from Central State College in Edmond, Oklahoma, in 1970. She would also receive a master's degree in guidance and counseling from that same institution in 1979.

Aragon enlisted in the Oklahoma Air National Guard on September 9, 1979, as an airman basic in the 219th Engineering Installation Squadron stationed in Oklahoma City, Oklahoma. She received her commission through the Academy of Military Science at Knoxville, Tennessee, in October 1981. She returned to the 219th EIS as an administrative officer. In February 1989, then Captain Aragon became the first female commander in the history of the Oklahoma Air National Guard when she assumed command of the 137th Services Squadron at Will Rogers World Airport Air National Guard Base. She became the first female to hold the rank of brigadier general in the history of the United States Air National Guard as the commander and assistant adjutant general for the Oklahoma Air National Guard in March 2003. As Assistant Adjutant General for Air, General Aragon reported directed to the Adjutant General of Oklahoma.

While serving as assistant adjutant general, General Aragon was appointed to serve as the Air National Guard assistant to the Assistant Secretary of the Air Force for Financial Management and Comptroller. She served in that position from 2003 to 2005. In 2006, General Aragon was appointed Air National Guard assistant to the Air Force Deputy Chief of Staff Manpower and Personnel. In that position, General Aragon oversaw policies and plans covering all part of the Air Force's military and civilian personnel management.

Fallin administration
On November 18, 2010, Governor-elect of Oklahoma Mary Fallin announced that she would nominate General Aragon to serve as her Secretary of Veterans Affairs in her Cabinet. If confirmed by the Oklahoma Senate, Aragon will become the first woman to hold that position. As secretary, Aragon will be Fallin's chief adviser on matters related to the policies and operations of the Oklahoma Department of Veterans Affairs.

Aragon was sworn in as the Secretary of Veterans Affairs on January 10, 2011.

Personal life
In addition to her military career, Aragon has served as an elementary school teacher and an elementary school principal. She was named an OKC Chamber of Commerce Excellent Educator of the Year in 1990 and an Oklahoma City Principal of the Year in 1992. Aragon also serves on the boards of the Red Cross Chapter of Central Oklahoma, the Oklahoma Commission on the Status of Women and the Girl Scouts of Western Oklahoma. She was named by The Journal Record as 2008 Woman of the Year and in 2009, she was inducted in the Oklahoma Women's Hall of Fame.

Awards and decorations

Effective dates of promotion

References
Governor-elect Fallin names Aragon Secretary of Veterans Affairs, Office of Governor-elect Mary Fallin, 11-18-2011
Fallin names veterans affairs secretary, Tulsa World, by World Capital Bureau, 11-19-10
Aragon honored as Oklahoma Women's Hall of Fame inductee The Norman Transcript

External links
Rita Aragon official National Guard Bureau biography
Oral History Interview with Rita Aragon

Living people
United States Air Force generals
Recipients of the Air Force Distinguished Service Medal
Recipients of the Legion of Merit
State cabinet secretaries of Oklahoma
1948 births
Female United States Air Force personnel
University of Central Oklahoma alumni
Place of birth missing (living people)
21st-century American women